Oliver Peter Martin John (born February 9, 1959) is a German personality psychologist and professor of psychology at the University of California, Berkeley. He is known for co-developing the 1998 Big Five Inventory.

References

External links
Faculty page

Living people
Personality psychologists
21st-century American psychologists
1959 births
University of California, Berkeley College of Letters and Science faculty
University of Oregon alumni
20th-century American psychologists